This One's for Blanton! is a studio album by the American pianist, composer and bandleader Duke Ellington, duetting with Ray Brown, recorded in December 1972 and released on the Pablo label. 
The title refers to early Duke Ellington collaborator and influential yet short-lived double bass player Jimmy Blanton.

Reception
The AllMusic review by Scott Yanow called the album "delightful and often-playful music".

Track listing
All compositions by Duke Ellington except as indicated
 "Do Nothin' Till You Hear from Me" (Ellington, Bob Russell) - 5:36  
 "Pitter Panther Patter" - 3:06  
 "Things Ain't What They Used to Be" (Mercer Ellington) - 4:00  
 "Sophisticated Lady" (Ellington, Irving Mills, Mitchell Parish) - 5:30  
 "See See Rider" (Traditional) - 3:07  
 "Fragmented Suite for Piano and Bass: First Movement" (Ray Brown, Ellington) - 4:51  
 "Fragmented Suite for Piano and Bass: Second Movement" (Brown, Ellington) - 5:11  
 "Fragmented Suite for Piano and Bass: Third Movement" (Brown, Ellington) - 3:40  
 "Fragmented Suite for Piano and Bass: Fourth Movement" (Brown, Ellington) - 4:58
Recorded at United Recording Studios in Las Vegas, Nevada on December 5, 1972.

Personnel
Duke Ellington – piano
Ray Brown - bass

References

Pablo Records albums
Duke Ellington albums
Albums produced by Norman Granz
1974 albums